This article lists the metropolitans and patriarchs of Moscow, spiritual heads of the Russian Orthodox Church. Since 1308, there have been 59.

History 

The  Russian Orthodox Church traces its beginnings to the Christianization of Kievan Rus' at Kiev in 988 AD. In 1316 the Metropolitan of Kiev changed his see to the city of Vladimir, and in 1322 moved again to Moscow. In 1589, the see was elevated to a Patriarchate. The Patriarchate was abolished by the Church reform of Peter the Great in 1721 and replaced by the Most Holy Governing Synod, and the Bishop of Moscow came to be called a Metropolitan again. The Patriarchate was restored in 1917 and suspended by the Soviet government in 1925. It was reintroduced for the last time in 1943, during World War II by the initiative of Soviet leader Joseph Stalin.
To this date, 19 of the Metropolitans have been glorified in the Russian Orthodox Church.

Metropolitans of Kiev and all Rus' (permanent residence in Moscow, 1325–1441) 
For a list of metropolitans before the seat of the Metropolis of Kiev and all Rus' was moved to Moscow, see List of metropolitans and patriarchs of Kyiv.

Following his acceptance of the Council of Florence, Isidore of Kiev returned to Moscow in 1441 as a Ruthenian cardinal. He was arrested by the Grand Duke of Moscow and accused of apostasy. The Grand Duke deposed Isidore and in 1448 installed his own candidate as Metropolitan of Kyiv — Jonah. This was carried out without the approval of Patriarch Gregory III of Constantinople. When Isidore died in 1458, the Orthodox dioceses within the territory of the Grand Duchy of Lithuania, including Kyiv, were reorganized. The metropolitan see was moved to Vilnius, the capital of the Grand Duchy of Lithuania. A parallel succession to the title ensued between Moscow and Vilnius.

Metropolitans of Moscow and all Rus' (1448–1589) 
Isidore, who was of Greek origin, submitted to the articles of the Bull of Union with the Greeks which united the Orthodox Church in Russia with the Latin Church. The Grand Prince of Moscow — Vasily II — voided the union and imprisoned Isidore for some time. Following that incident, the Grand Prince removed Isidore from office and appointed his own man — Jonah. These decisions were not recognised by Patriarch Gregory III of Constantinople who continued to recognise Isidore as the canonical metropolitan. As a result, in 1448, Jonah unilaterally changed his title to "Metropolitan of Moscow and all Rus' " which was tantamount to a declaration of independence of the Church in eastern Rus' from the Patriarchate of Constantinople. All sixteen successive hierarchs of the Metropolis of Moscow and all Rus' were selected by the civil power and installed without the approval of Patriarchate of Constantinople. Successive patriarchs continued to recognize Isidore and his successors as hierarchs of the Metropolis of Kiev and all Rus'.

Patriarchs of Moscow and all Rus' (1589–1721)

Metropolitans and archbishops of Moscow (1721–1917)

Patriarchs of Moscow and all Rus' (restored, 1917–present)

Timeline of patriarchs

See also
 Russian Orthodox Church
 Patriarch of Moscow and all Rus'
 List of metropolitans and patriarchs of Kyiv
 List of current popes and patriarchs
 List of current Christian leaders
 Eastern Orthodox Church
 Organization of the Eastern Orthodox Church

References

List of Metropolitans and Patriarchs
Eastern Orthodoxy in Russia
Moscow
Moscow
Metropolitans and Patriarchs